L'autre is a VHS recorded by the French singer Mylène Farmer, containing all the singer's videoclips from 1991 to 1992. It was released in September 1992 in France.

This VHS includes all the videos from the third studio album L'autre... This fourth music video was not entitled Les Clips Vol. IV, but was named L'autre... since the videoclips available on this VHS are these of the fourth singles from this album.

This VHS content is also included on the DVD Music Videos I.

Formats

This video was released on VHS and Laserdisc.

Track listings

+ Backstage of the videos "Désenchantée" (14:23).

Credits and personnel

 Videos directed by Laurent Boutonnat
 Backstage filmed by François Hanss

Certifications and sales

References

Mylène Farmer video albums
1992 video albums